JR Bus collectively refers to the bus operations of Japan Railways Group (JR Group) companies in Japan. JR Bus is operated by eight regional companies, each owned by a JR railway company. JR Bus companies provide regional, long distance, and chartered bus services.

List of companies

History 
The Ministry of Railways of Japan started its first bus operation in Aichi Prefecture in 1930 and gradually expanded bus routes. The Japanese National Railways (JNR), public corporation established in 1949, succeeded the bus operations, then called Kokutetsu Bus or JNR Bus. In 1987, JNR was divided into regional railway companies together with its bus operations. JR companies later separated their bus operations to subsidiaries in 1988 (JR East, JR Central, JR West), 2000 (JR Hokkaido), 2001 (JR Kyushu) and 2004 (JR Shikoku).

Examples of vehicles

Regional route vehicles

Expressway route vehicles 
JR Bus Tohoku, JR Bus Kanto, JR Tokai Bus and Chugoku JR Bus share a common livery based on the JNR Bus livery.

External links 

 https://web.archive.org/web/20151203224900/http://www.kakuyasubus.jp/ (jointly operated by JR Bus companies for promotion of intercity buses)  

Bus companies of Japan
Japan Railway companies